This is a list of diplomatic missions in Uzbekistan.  At present, the capital of Tashkent hosts 44 embassies.

Diplomatic missions in Tashkent

Embassies

Other representative offices or delegations 
  (Delegation)
  Tatarstan (Office)

Consular missions

Samarkand 
 (Consulate-General)
 (Consulate-General)

Termez 
 (Consulate-General)

Closed missions 
  (Embassy)
  FR Yugoslavia (Embassy)
  (Consulate)
  Iraq (Embassy)
  (Embassy)
  (Embassy)
  (Embassy) (closed in 2016)
  (Embassy)

Non-resident embassies

In Moscow except as noted

 (Yerevan)

 (Vienna)

 (Ankara)
 (Baku)

 (Riga)
 (Seoul)
 (Helsinki)

 (Tehran)
 (Seoul)

 (Beijing)

 (New Delhi)

 (Islamabad)

 (Valletta)
 (Tehran)
 (Kyiv)

 (Oslo)

 (Tehran)

 (Tehran)

 (Ankara)

 (Stockholm)
 (Ankara)

 (Beijing)

References

Tashkent Diplomatic List (In Russian)

Diplomatic missions in Uzbekistan
Uzbekistan
Diplomatic missions